Salvia anatolica is a rare perennial herb that is endemic to a small area between Divriği and Kemaliye in Turkey, growing on stony slopes and oak scrub forest at  elevation. It is similar to another Salvia that is endemic to Turkey, S. bracteata.

The plant blooms in May and June and is a hemicryptophyte.

Notes

anatolica
Flora of Turkey